Michal Rajčan (born 1 October 1980 in Banská Bystrica) is a Slovak former alpine skier who competed in the 2002 Winter Olympics.

References

1980 births
Living people
Slovak male alpine skiers
Olympic alpine skiers of Slovakia
Alpine skiers at the 2002 Winter Olympics
Sportspeople from Banská Bystrica